R (Alconbury Developments Ltd) v SS for Environment, Transport and the Regions [2001] UKHL 23 is a UK constitutional law case, concerning judicial review.

Facts
Alconbury Developments Ltd and others challenged (1) the Minister’s power to determine planning appeals, rather than an inspector, (2) a Minister’s power to approve compulsory purchase orders under the Highway Act 1980, and (3) a new rail link approved under the Transport and Works Act 1992.

The claimants argued that (1) the decisions affected their civil rights, (2) under the ECHR art 6(1) those questions should be decided by an independent and impartial tribunal, with court review, not a Minister, (3) there was insufficient judicial control for ECHR art 6(1) because the statutory appeals did not allow for a rehearing on the merits.

Judgment
The House of Lords held that, although civil rights were affected and there should be independent oversight, ECHR art 6(1) did not require a court to rehear the merits of a decision. Statutory appeals to the High Court were sufficient review of legality.

Lord Slynn said proportionality should be recognised as a general principle of English law:

Lord Nolan said this:

Lord Hoffmann said the following:

Lord Clyde said this:

See also

United Kingdom constitutional law

Notes

References

United Kingdom constitutional case law